The 2018 Stanford Cardinal men's soccer team will represent Stanford University during the 2018 NCAA Division I men's soccer season.

The Cardinal enter the season as the three-time defending national champions. This is the first team season since 1994 that a program enters the season as a three-time defending champion. In 1994, the Virginia Cavaliers men's soccer program entered the season as three-time defending national champions, where they would go on to win an unprecedented fourth-consecutive title.

Background 

Stanford enters the 2018 season as the three-time defending national champions.

Offseason

Additions

Departures

2018 recruiting class

Roster

Schedule

Spring season

Regular season

NCAA tournament

Goals Record 

As of December 3, 2018

Disciplinary Record

As of October 12, 2018

Awards and honors

2019 MLS Super Draft

Rankings

References

Stanford Cardinal
Stanford Cardinal men's soccer seasons
Stanford Cardinal, Soccer
Stanford Cardinal
Stanford